The Japan national youth handball team is the national under–18 handball team of Japan. It is controlled by the Japan Handball Association, and is an affiliate of the International Handball Federation as well as a member of the Asian Handball Federation. The team represents Japan in international matches.

Statistics

Youth Olympic Games 

 Champions   Runners up   Third place   Fourth place

World Championship record 
 Champions   Runners up   Third place   Fourth place

References

External links
World Men's Youth Championship table
European Men's Youth Championship table

Handball in Japan
Men's national youth handball teams
Handball
Handball